The Fred Hartman Bridge is a cable-stayed bridge in the U.S. state of Texas spanning the Houston Ship Channel. The bridge carries  of State Highway 146 (SH 146), between the cities of Baytown and La Porte (east of Houston). The bridge is also expected to carry State Highway 99 (SH 99) (Grand Parkway) when it is completed around Houston.

The bridge, named for Fred Hartman (1908–1991), the editor and publisher of the Baytown Sun from 1950 to 1974, is the longest cable-stayed bridge in Texas, and one of only four such bridges in the state, the others being Veterans Memorial Bridge in Orange County, Margaret Hunt Hill Bridge in Dallas and Bluff Dale Suspension Bridge in Erath County. It is the 77th largest bridge in the world. The construction cost of the bridge was $91.25 million.

The bridge replaced the Baytown Tunnel (of depth clearance ). The last section of the Baytown Tunnel was removed from the Houston Ship Channel on September 14, 1999, with removal of the tunnel being the responsibility of the Texas Department of Transportation (TxDOT).

Construction

In October 1985 the Texas Highway department announced the project and estimated it would take two years to complete. The bridge was designed by Greiner Engineering, Inc., which was acquired by URS Corporation in 1995, which in turn was acquired by AECOM in October 2014. Construction began in 1987 and was contracted by Williams Brothers and Traylor Brothers construction companies. In 1993, The firm selected to produce the steel, a Mexican company, went bankrupt. The contract was then awarded to a South African company which caused complaints because of the country's apartheid policies. After the completion date was pushed back several times, a letter was sent to the Texas Department of Transportation's executive director, William Burnett from the city of Baytown via the Baytown Sun in early 1995 which helped spur interest in finishing the project. Finally, on September 27, 1995 the Fred Hartman Bridge had its grand opening ceremony, which was hosted by Baytown Chamber of Commerce and La Porte Chamber of Commerce. Notable guests include George W. Bush, Miss Texas 1995, William Burnett and the Hartman family. Fred Hartman died in 1991 and did not live to see his dream come to fruition.

See also

References

External links

Cable-stayed bridges in the United States
Bridges completed in 1995
Crossings of the Houston Ship Channel
Towers in Texas
Greater Houston
Galveston Bay Area
Transportation buildings and structures in Harris County, Texas
Road bridges in Texas
Steel bridges in the United States
Concrete bridges in the United States